Makovsky (from mak meaning ), derived of the Polish surname Makowski, is a habitational name for someone from a place called Makov.

It is the surname of a Russian artistic family:

Egor Makovsky (1802-1866), amateur painter and accountant, father of:
Alexandra Makovskaya (1837–1915), Russian landscape painter
Konstantin Makovsky (1839–1915), Russian history and portrait painter, father of:
Sergey Makovsky (1877–1962), Russian poet, art critic, and organizer of many art expositions.
Elena Luksch-Makovskaya (1878-1967), Russian painter and sculptor, residing in Germany.
Nikolay Makovsky (1842–1886), Russian genre painter 
Vladimir Makovsky (1846–1920), Russian genre painter and art collector, father of:
Aleksandr Makovsky (1869–1924), Russian painter

Makovský is used by Czech people: 

Vincenc Makovský (1900–1966), Czech sculptor and designer
Michal Makovský (born 1976), former Czech motorcycle speedway rider
Miloš Makovský (born 1957), Czech rock guitarist

Other people with the same last name:
Judianna Makovsky (born 1967), American costume designer 
Zach Makovsky, American mixed martial arts fighter